The 2003 Barbarians end of season tour was a series of matches played in May–June 2003 in Scotland, Wales and England by Barbarian F.C.

Results 

2003
2003 rugby union tours
2002–03 in Scottish rugby union
2002–03 in Welsh rugby union
2002–03 in English rugby union
May 2003 sports events in the United Kingdom